Anding Town is a town situated in the southeastern side of Daxing District, Beijing, China. It shares border with Qingyundian Town in the north, Zhangziying and Wanzhuang Towns in the east, Lixian Town in the south, and Weishanzhuang Town in the west. In 2020, it had a population of 30,764.

This town's name literally translates to "Stability", and it was given by the original settlers who were mostly from Shanxi.

History

Administrative divisions 
As of 2021, Anding Town is formed from the following 33 villages:

Gallery

See also 

 List of township-level divisions of Beijing

References 

Towns in Beijing
Daxing District